Ece Uslu (born 9 September 1974) is a Turkish actress. She appeared in more than twenty films since 1991.

Selected filmography

References

External links 

1974 births
Living people
Turkish film actresses
Turkish television actresses
Actresses from İzmir